Dale Edward Hartt (born April 4, 1979) is an American mixed martial artist, who is perhaps best known for his three fight stint in the Lightweight division of the Ultimate Fighting Championship.

Mixed martial arts career
Hartt made his professional mixed martial arts debut on December 11, 2004, when he faced Gary Bonenfant at Mass Destruction 18. He won the fight via first round submission. Following this win, Hartt would compile an undefeated record of 5–0 before being signed by the Ultimate Fighting Championship in mid-2008.

Ultimate Fighting Championship
With an undefeated 5–0 record, Hartt signed with the UFC in June 2008. Hartt made his debut against fellow newcomer Shannon Gugerty at UFC Fight Night: Silva vs. Irvin on July 19, 2008. He lost the fight via rear-naked choke. In his second fight with the promotion, Hartt faced Corey Hill at UFC: Fight for the Troops on December 10, 2008. Hartt won the fight via TKO, after Hill broke his leg throwing a kick.

Hartt then faced Dennis Siver at UFC 99 on June 13, 2009. He lost the fight via rear-naked choke, and after dropping to 1–2 in the UFC, was released from the promotion.

Post-UFC career
In his first fight after being released from UFC, Hartt faced Guillaume DeLorenzi at Ringside MMA: No Escape on June 18, 2010. He lost the fight via shoulder injury TKO.

Personal life
Dale has two children and now works in finance. After fighting he returned to university and graduated with a degree in finance and management from the University of Maine magna cum laude. Dale still enjoys training and the occasional grappling competition.

Mixed martial arts record

|-
|Loss
|align=center|6–3
|Guillaume DeLorenzi
|TKO (shoulder injury)
|Ringside MMA: No Escape
|
|align=center|2
|align=center|0:49
|Centre Pierre-Charbonneau, Montreal, Quebec, Canada
|
|-
|Loss
|align=center|6–2
|Dennis Siver
|Submission (rear-naked choke)
|UFC 99
|
|align=center|1
|align=center|3:23
|Cologne, Germany
|
|-
|Win
|align=center|6–1
|Corey Hill
|TKO (leg fracture)
|UFC: Fight for the Troops
|
|align=center|2
|align=center|0:20
|Fayetteville, North Carolina, United States
|
|-
|Loss
|align=center|5–1
|Shannon Gugerty
|Submission (rear-naked choke)
|UFC Fight Night: Silva vs. Irvin
|
|align=center|1
|align=center|3:33
|Las Vegas, Nevada, United States
|Lightweight debut.
|-
|Win
|align=center|5–0
|Keith Ferreira
|Submission (strikes)
|FFP: Untamed 19
|
|align=center|1
|align=center|1:35
|Plymouth, Massachusetts, United States
|
|-
|Win
|align=center|4–0
|Matt Lee
|KO
|FFP: Untamed 11
|
|align=center|2
|align=center|N/A
|Massachusetts, United States
|
|-
|Win
|align=center|3–0
|Pat Shaw
|TKO
|FFP: Untamed 6
|
|align=center|2
|align=center|1:17
|Brockton, Massachusetts, United States
|
|-
|Win
|align=center|2–0
|Wesley Welch
|TKO
|RITR 11: Rumble in the Ring 11
|
|align=center|2
|align=center|1:48
|Auburn, Washington, United States
|
|-
|Win
|align=center|1–0
|Gary Bonenfant
|Submission
|MD 18: Mass Destruction 18
|
|align=center|1
|align=center|N/A
|Boston, Massachusetts, United States
|
|-

References

External links

Dale Hartt's UFC Profile

Living people
1979 births
American male mixed martial artists
Mixed martial artists from Maine
Lightweight mixed martial artists
Mixed martial artists utilizing Brazilian jiu-jitsu
American practitioners of Brazilian jiu-jitsu
Sportspeople from Bangor, Maine
Ultimate Fighting Championship male fighters